The term imamate or imamah (imāmah) means "leadership" and refers to the office of an imam or a state ruled by an imam.

Theology
Imamate, in Sunni doctrine the caliphate
Naqshbandi Sufi Imamate, under the household of Hazrat Ishaan
Imamate in Shia doctrine, the doctrine of the leadership of the Muslim community. For specific Shia sects, see:
Imamate in Twelver doctrine
Imamate in Ismaili doctrine
Imamate in Nizari doctrine

Politics
Caucasian Imamate, a state during the early and mid-19th century in the Eastern Caucasus
Imamate of Oman, a state existed in what is now Oman
Imamate of Aussa, an early modern state in Ethiopia
Imamate of Futa Jallon, a state in West Africa from 1725 until 1896
Almamyate of Futa Toro, a state in West Africa from 1776 until 1861
Hiraab Imamate, a Somali state in the 17th and 18th centuries
Imams of Yemen, political leadership of the Zaidi branch of Shia from 897 until 1962

Islam and politics
Islamic belief and doctrine
Islamic terminology